The prime minister of Angola was a high government official in Angola re-established by Angola's 1992 constitution with limited powers as head of government.

Along with the rest of the Council of Ministers, the prime minister was appointed by the president. The position was originally created when Angola achieved independence from Portugal on 11 November 1975, but was abolished in 1978 when President Agostinho Neto consolidated his power. There was no prime minister until 1991, when President José Eduardo dos Santos reinstated the position following a peace agreement with the opposition party. The post was also vacant between 1999 and 2002.

The post was again abolished due to the 2010 Constitution of Angola, which integrates the functions of the prime minister into the office of the president, who is not subjected to the confidence of the parliamentary majority, contrarily to the prime minister.

List of prime ministers of Angola

See also
List of current Angolan ministers

Government of Angola
Angola, Prime Minister